is a public day school established by the Tokyo Metropolitan Government. The campus is located in the Meguro district of Tokyo, Japan. The school name comes from the Japanese word for cherry blossoms. It is a combined junior high school (students study for 3 years) and senior high school (also 3 years).

Access
The school is 10 minutes on foot from Toritsu-Daigaku Station on the Tōkyū Tōyoko Line.
City buses also stop at the campus.

Extracurricular activities
Cultural
Wind instruments
Field work
Japanese culture
Creative section
Theater
Photography
Art
Light music
Science

Sports
Soccer
Japanese version of baseball
Tennis (male/female)
Girls volleyball
Badminton
Kendo
Basketball (male/female)
Swimming
Athletics
Hard baseball
Archery

References

External links
 Oshukan Secondary School
 Tokyo Metropolitan Oshukan Secondary School

Junior high schools in Japan
High schools in Tokyo
Educational institutions established in 2006
2006 establishments in Japan